Nuclear power in Switzerland is generated by three nuclear power plants, with a total of four operational reactors (see list below). In 2013, they produced 24.8 terawatt-hours (TWh) of electricity, down 5.8% from 2007, when 26.4 TWh were produced. Nuclear power accounted for 36.4% of the nation's gross electricity generation of 68.3 TWh, while 57.9% was produced by hydroelectric plants and 5.7% came from conventional thermal power stations and non-hydro renewable energy sources.

In addition, there were a number of research reactors in Switzerland, such as the CROCUS reactor at the École Polytechnique Fédérale de Lausanne which is currently the last one left since 2013.
Switzerland uses nuclear energy only for peaceful purposes. Any project for the adoption of nuclear weapons was definitively dropped in 1988.

Nuclear waste from power plants was processed mostly overseas until 2016. Storage is done on surface sites as plans are underway to move nuclear waste underground.

In 2011, the federal authorities decided to gradually phase out nuclear power in Switzerland as a consequence of the Fukushima accident in Japan. In late 2013 the operator BKW decided to cease all electrical generation in 2019 in the Mühleberg plant, which has a similar design to Fukushima. Axpo is expected to come up with a similar decision for its aging Beznau Nuclear Power Plant, which houses the oldest commercial reactor of the world.

As of 8 December 2014, the National Council has voted to limit the operational life-time of the Beznau Nuclear Power Plant to 60 years, forcing its two reactors to be decommissioned by 2029 and 2031, respectively. A popular initiative calling for nuclear power phase-out by 2029 was rejected by voters in 2016; however, on 1 January 2018 an amendment (article 12a) to the Swiss Nuclear Energy Act (Kernenergiegesetz) came into effect, prohibiting the issuing of new general licences for nuclear power plants.

Reactors

Power reactors 

Switzerland has three nuclear power plants with four reactors in operation as of late December, 2019:
(Beznau and Gösgen also provide district heating in addition to power production)
 Beznau 1 (1969) and Beznau 2 (1972) (PWR) – 365 MWe each
 Plant safety (each unit): Double containment, large dry; 3 lines safety injection, high and low pressure; 3 lines emergency feedwater; part of these ECCS systems in a bunkered building; ability to connect external water sources
 Gösgen (KKG) (1979) (PWR) – 970 MWe
 Plant safety: Double containment, large dry; 4 lines for high and low pressure safety injection (50% each); 4 lines emergency feedwater (50% each); 2 additional lines emergency feedwater; part of these ECCS systems bunkered; ability to connect external water sources
 Leibstadt (KKL) (1984) (BWR) – 1,165 MWe
 Safety: Double containment (with additional wetwell), pressure suppression (4000 m3 water pool); 4 lines (50% each) low pressure injection (with 2 lines RHR), 2 diverse lines high pressure injection; 1 additional line with 2 pumps emergency injection (with 1 line RHR); nearly all the ECCS systems bunkered; ability to connect external water sources.

The Beznau reactors are owned by the Axpo Holding, that also control major parts of Leibstadt. Alpiq own 40% of Gösgen and 27.4% of Leibstadt.

Decommissioned and closed reactors 
In May 2017, Switzerland voted to phase out nuclear power in the country. A timetable for the phase out of nuclear power plants has not been set. The cost of decommissioning and waste management has been estimated at USD24.7 billion.
 Lucens (1968) (GCHWR) – 6 MWe
The Lucens experimental reactor power plant was opened in 1962. It housed an experimental power reactor, heavy-water moderated and cooled by carbon dioxide. It has been shut down since 1969 after a partial core meltdown. The site has been decontaminated and decommissioned. The meltdown is considered the worst nuclear meltdown in Switzerland's history.
 Mühleberg (KKM) (1972-2019) (BWR) – 355 MWeShut down on 20 December 2019 and being prepared for nuclear decommissioning. The Mühleberg reactor is owned by BKW (Bernische Kraftwerke AG), majority-owned by the canton of Berne.  Plant safety: Double containment, pressure suppression (torus, with 2200 m3 water pool); 4 lines low pressure core spray; 4 lines RHR (torus cooling); 2 turbine-driven HP systems; part of the ECCS systems bunkered; ability to connect external water sources.

 Research and teaching reactors 

 SAPHIR The reactors that became known as SAPHIR was a 10–100 kW-range swimming-pool reactor of demonstration brought to Switzerland by the U.S. delegation to the First Conference on the Peaceful Uses of Atomic Energy that took place in Geneva in August 1955. It has been the first reactor ever shown in operation to the public, worldwide. After the conference the reactor was purchased by the Swiss government on behalf of Reaktor AG, a consortium interested in the development of nuclear energy in Switzerland. The reactor was moved to Würenlingen on the location of the future Paul Scherrer Institut and received its name, SAPHIR, on 17 May 1957. (The name of the reactor was inspired by the color of the Cherenkov radiation which was visible when the reactor was in operation.) Operable until 1994.
 University of Geneva AGN-201-P reactorThe University of Geneva acquired a 20 W water-moderated and graphite-reflected research reactor fueled by 20%-enriched Uranium from Aerojet General Nucleonics (AGN) in 1958. It was operated mostly as a teaching reactor until 1989, when it was shutdown and decommissioned. 
 University of Basel AGN-211-P reactor The University of Basel acquired the AGN-211-P reactor presented at the 1958 World Exposition in Brussels, Belgium. It was a 2 kW water-moderated reactor fueled with high-enriched Uranium and operated from 1959 to 2013 as a teaching and experimental reactor, used amongst other things for neutron activation analysis. 
 DIORIT A small heavy water-cooled and -moderated research reactor, operated 1960 to 1977 at the former Federal Institute for Reactor Research (now Paul Scherrer Institut). There was also, in the context of Cold War, the theoretical idea of producing weapons-grade Plutonium in it, besides its research purpose. It was also the first reactor to be entirely designed and built in Switzerland.   
 PROTEUS PROTEUS was a zero-power research reactor operated from 1968 to 2011 at what is now the Paul Scherrer Institute, Würenlingen. Its peculiarity was that its core was composed of a hollow cavity whose configuration could be changed by filling it with very diverse types of nuclear fuels, including sub-critical assemblies. It was otherwise composed of a graphite reflector and driver containing 5%-enriched Uranium dioxide fuel rods. This flexibility lead it to be used in four major experimental programs exploring varied reactor designs such as Gas-cooled fast reactors, Pebble-bed reactors, High-conversion Light Water Reactors and finally configurations employing real spent nuclear fuel from Swiss nuclear power plants. 
 CROCUS It is a zero-power (licensed to 100 W max power) LWR used for teaching at the École Polytechnique Fédérale de Lausanne (EPFL). CROCUS is a critical assembly, built in part from the elements of a dismantled subcritical assembly: Cactus. The name of the latter originated for the numerous instrumentation bars that came out of the core. CROCUS is another name in the XXXus series for nuclear installations at EPFL, e.g. the D-T nuclear fusion facility: Lotus..

 Seismicity 

Extending across the north and south side of the Alps, Switzerland lies at the junction of the Apulian and Eurasian tectonic plates, and there are many active seismic areas under the mountains that show that stresses continue to be released along deep fault lines. The 1356 Basel earthquake is the most significant seismological event to have occurred in Central Europe in recorded history and may have had a Mw magnitude as strong as 7.1.

Between 2002 and 2004 a major study was conducted to assess the seismic risk to Swiss nuclear power plants. The PEGASOS study, which cost around 10 million Swiss Francs (approximately $11 million) and which was conducted by 21 European experts with American involvement, concluded that the earthquake risk in Switzerland is twice as large as had been previously thought.

In 2011, following the nuclear emergencies at Japan's Fukushima I Nuclear Power Plant and other nuclear facilities Swiss Federal Councillor Doris Leuthard announced on 14 March a freeze in the authorisation procedures for three new nuclear power plants (see Politics''), and ordered a safety review of the country's existing plants.

Following Fukushima the Swiss cantons of Basel-Stadt, Basel-Landschaft and Jura asked the French government to suspend the operation of Fessenheim while undertaking a safety review based on the lessons learned from Japan. On 6 April 2011, the Grand Council of Basel-Stadt went further and voted for the plant to be closed. French President Emmanuel Macron announced in November 2018 the closure of Fessenheim's reactors, scheduled for 2020.

Waste management 
Radioactive waste from nuclear power plants is in the tens of thousand tonnes in Switzerland. Its management is the responsibility of the producer. Up until 2006, processing of nuclear waste was mostly done overseas. A 10-year moratorium on its export was issued in 2006. Radioactive waste from nuclear power plants in Switzerland is stored on surface sites (mostly in the ZWILAG-building). Plans are underway to move the waste to permanent sites underground.

Politics 

In Switzerland there have been many referendums on the topic of nuclear energy, beginning in 1979 with an initiative for nuclear safety, which was rejected. In 1984, there was a vote on an initiative "for a future without new nuclear power stations" which was rejected with 45% of voters in favor and 55% opposed. On 23 September 1990 Switzerland had two more referendums about nuclear power. The initiative "stop the construction of nuclear power stations," which proposed a ten-year moratorium on the construction of new nuclear power plants, was passed with 54.5% to 45.5%. The initiative for a phase-out was rejected with 47.1% votes in favor against 52.9% opposed. In 2000 there was a vote on a Green Tax for support of solar energy. It was rejected with 31% in favor to 67% opposed.

On 18 May 2003, there were two referendums: "Electricity without Nuclear," asking for a decision on a nuclear power phase-out, and "Moratorium Plus," for an extension of the earlier decided moratorium on the construction of new nuclear power plants. Both were turned down. The results were: Moratorium Plus: 41.6% Yes, 58.4% No; Electricity without Nuclear: 33.7% Yes, 66.3% No. The program of the "Electricity without Nuclear" petition was to shut down all nuclear power stations by 2033, starting with Unit 1 and 2 of Beznau nuclear power stations, Mühleberg in 2005, Gösgen in 2009, and Leibstadt in 2014. "Moratorium Plus" was for an extension of the moratorium for another 10 years, and additionally a condition to stop the present reactors after 40 years of operation. In order to extend the 40 years by 10 more years another referendum would have to be held. The rejection of the Moratorium Plus had come to surprise to many, as opinion polls before the referendum have showed acceptance. Reasons for the rejections in both cases were seen in the worsened economic situation.

On 10 June 2008, ATEL submitted an application to the Swiss Federal Office of Energy for the construction of a new plant in the Niederamt region (SO). A further two applications were to be presented by Axpo and BKW before the end of 2008.

In May 2011, the Swiss government decided to abandon plans to build new nuclear reactors. The country's five existing reactors will be allowed to continue operating, but will not be replaced at the end of their life span. The last will go offline in 2034.
In October 2016 energy companies formally withdrew their 2008 applications to build three new power plants.

In November 2016, a referendum was held concerning a Green Party initiative that would have phased out all nuclear plants after a life-span of 45 years. The three oldest nuclear plants (Beznau 1 and 2, and Mühleberg) would have had to be shut down as early as 2017, and every remaining plant by 2029. The initiative was rejected by 54.2% of voters.

On 21 May 2017, 58% of Swiss voters accepted the new Energy Act establishing the energy strategy 2050 and forbidding the construction of new nuclear power plants.

See also 
 Energy in Switzerland
 Electricity sector in Switzerland
 List of nuclear reactors – Switzerland
 Nuclear phase-out – Switzerland
 Science and technology in Switzerland
 Switzerland and weapons of mass destruction

References

External links 
 Nuclear energy on the website of the Swiss Federal Office of Energy (SFOE).
 Maps of nuclear power reactors: Switzerland.
 Preparing a seismic hazard model for Switzerland: The view from PEGASOS Expert Group 3.
 
 
 Faryal Mirza, Nuclear plants safe but waste management not. Swissinfo, 24 April 2007. Last accessed 24 April 2007.

Science and technology in Switzerland